Charlotte County was a county in the colonial Province of New York in the British American colonies. It was created from Albany County on March 24, 1772. The county was named for Charlotte of Mecklenburg-Strelitz, wife of George III of the United Kingdom. Its boundaries extended far further than any current county. Its western boundary ran from the northern boundary of Albany County to the Canada line, at a point near the old village of St. Regis. Its southern boundary was what is now the northern boundary of Saratoga County. Much of western Vermont, then claimed by New York, was also part of the county. Its northern border was also the Canada–US border. Its county seat was Fort Edward.

On April 2, 1784, the new state's legislature voted to change the name to Washington County, in honor of George Washington, stating, “From and after the passing of this act, the county of Tryon shall be called and known by the name of Montgomery, and the county of Charlotte by the name of Washington.”  In 1799 Clinton County was created from part of Washington County.  Clinton County itself was partitioned to form other upstate counties.  The Town of Cambridge was transferred in 1791 from Albany County to Washington County.

See also
List of former United States counties 
List of New York counties

References

Bibliography

Former counties of the United States
Pre-statehood history of New York (state)
Washington County, New York